The Workmen's Compensation Act 1897 was British law in operation from 1897 to 1946. The Britain followed the German model. Joseph Chamberlain, leader of the Liberal Unionist party and in coalition with the Conservatives, designed a plan that was enacted under the Salisbury government in 1897. The Act was a key domestic achievement. It served its social purpose at no cost to the government, since employers were required to cover medical costs of injuries on the job. It replaced the Employers' Liability Act 1880, which gave the injured worker the right to sue the employer but put the burden of proof on the employee. After 1897, injured employees had only to show that they had been injured on the job. These are roughly the same rights German workers were awarded in their 1884 law. However, the act did not require any form of risk pooling such as insurance on the part of the employers. As pointed out in the International Labour Organization 1935 "Report on Social Insurance", compulsory insurance was only introduced in 1934, and only for coal miners at first.  The Act was replaced by an expanded scheme under the Workmen's Compensation Act 1906 whereby insurance became mandatory on the part of the employers, thus introducing the first social insurance scheme into the British case.

The 1897 act only covered blue-collar, industrial workers. As pointed out by Brodie, "Until 1906 there was no general coverage in Britain. Unlike Germany, Britain's law did not require security for compensation". Thus, the British working population was only fully covered under employer liability after the passage of the 1906 act and full "social insurance" for work-injury only came later with Beveridge. Part of the confusion on this issue is that pensions, unemployment and health care all had developed more or less into social insurance in the early 1900s. It was only "workmen's compensation" that was not a social insurance scheme prior to 1941 and Beveridge.

Definitions
A "workman" was defined as,

any person who is engaged in an employment to which this Act applies, whether by way of manual labour or otherwise.

The employments to which the Act applied were stated to be railways, mining and quarrying, factory work and laundry work.

Interpretation by courts
Courts took a restrictive interpretation of the Act in Simpson v. Ebbw Vale Steel, Iron & Coal Co. A widow claimed for the death of a colliery manager who had been killed in an underground accident. Lord Collins MR held that her dead husband was outside the Act's scope, because though the act extended to non-manual workers the victim "must still be a workman". He said the Act

presupposes a position of dependence; it treats the class of workmen as being in a sense , and the Legislature does for them what they cannot do for themselves: it gives them a sort of State insurance, it being assumed that they are either not sufficiently intelligent or not sufficiently in funds to insure themselves. In no sense can such a principle extend to those who are earning good salaries.

See also
Workers' compensation
Workmen's Compensation Act 1906
Contracts of Employment Act 1963
UK labour law
English tort law

Notes

References

 Jack J. Burriesci, "Historical Summary Of Workers' Compensation Laws" (March 7, 2001)  2001-R-0261 online
 D. C. Hanes, The First British Workmen's Compensation Act of 1897 (1968).  
Simon Deakin, 'The historical process of wage formation', in Linda Clarke et al., The Dynamics of Wage Relations in the New Europe (2000) pp. 38–9
Simon Deakin, 'Welfare State and Contract of Employment', in Noel Whiteside et al., Governance, Industry and Labour Markets in Britain and France (1998) pp. 212 ff.
Frankel, Lee K., and Dawson, Miles, M., Workingmen's Insurance in Europe, New York: Charities Publication Committee, 1911.

United Kingdom labour law
United Kingdom Acts of Parliament 1897
United Kingdom tort law
Repealed United Kingdom Acts of Parliament
1897 in labor relations
Workers' compensation